Podar World School  is a group of schools across India established in 1927, by Sheth Anandilal Podar. The schools offer streams such as Science, Commerce & Humanities.  The schools serve students from play school to Grade 12 as co-educational schools. The group is led by Raghav Podar.  The group also houses the pre-school and day care brand "Podar Jumbo Kids". In the year 2019 the group launched an extension to its brand with a school in partnership with New Nordic School of Finland called Podar Jumbo Kids Platinum. It even has an international brand called “podar international school”.

History 
Podar World Schools are a part of the Podar Education group, which was founded by Anandilal Podar in the year 1927 a businessman based in Mumbai with an interest in cotton mills. Mahatma Gandhi, who is known as a Father of Nation, was the first President of the Anandilal Podar Trust. The first school was started at Santacruz Mumbai, by founder President of Anandilal Podar Trust, Mohandas Karamchand Gandhi along with eminent personalities Shri Madan Mohan Malaviya and Shri Jamnalal Bajaj

Locations

List of Podar World School in Gujarat

Other 
The schools are located in the following locations:
 Maharashtra
 Nagpur
 Gujarat
 Vadodara
 Vapi
 Ankleshwar
 Rajasthan
 Jaipur
 Madhya Pradesh

See also 
 Podar International School
 Podar Group of Schools

References

External links 
 
 https://www.podareducation.org/

Central Board of Secondary Education
Schools in Vadodara
Schools in Jaipur